Sheykh Miri-ye Kalhor (also Romanized as Sheykh Mīrī-ye Kalhor and Shaikh Mīri Kalhur) is a village in Hemmatabad Rural District, in the Central District of Borujerd County, Lorestan Province, Iran. At the 2006 census, its population was 215, in 59 families.

References 

Towns and villages in Borujerd County